The Record Commissions were a series of six Royal Commissions of Great Britain and (from 1801) the United Kingdom which sat between 1800 and 1837 to inquire into the custody and public accessibility of the state archives. The Commissioners' work paved the way for the establishment of the Public Record Office in 1838. The Commissioners were also responsible for publishing various historical records, including the Statutes of the Realm (i.e. of England and Great Britain) to 1714 and the Acts of Parliament of Scotland to 1707, as well as a number of important medieval records.

Although the six Commissions were technically distinct from one another, there was a considerable degree of continuity between them, and it is common practice to regard them as a single entity and to refer to them in singular form as the Record Commission.

Activities

The first Commission was established on 19 July 1800, on the recommendation of a Select committee appointed earlier in the year, on the initiative and under the chairmanship of Charles Abbot, MP for Helston, "to inquire into the State of the Public Records of this kingdom". The public records were at this time housed in a variety of repositories, including the Tower of London, the chapter house of Westminster Abbey, the Pell Office adjacent to Westminster Hall, Somerset House, and elsewhere, often in a disorganised state and in highly unsuitable physical conditions. The idea of a single central repository was mooted as early as 1800, and became the subject of an abortive parliamentary bill in 1833, but it was to be some years before this was achieved: in the meantime, the Commissioners arranged for various moves of individual classes of records into new accommodation. These moves were well-intentioned and sometimes led to improvements in storage and arrangement, but more often resulted in the loss and further disorganisation of records.

The Commission (in particular the sixth Commission, which sat from 1831 to 1837) gained a reputation for inactivity, corruption, jobbery, and for including among its members too many persons in high office with other demands on their time. Some of these criticisms came from external observers, such as Sir Harris Nicolas; others were made by the Commission's own salaried employees, notably Henry Cole, and to a lesser extent Thomas Duffus Hardy. A Parliamentary committee, appointed to inquire into its work, reported in 1836 that the national archives remained scattered in a number of unsuitable locations, and in the custody of "a multitude of imperfectly responsible keepers". Out of these controversies emerged the Public Record Office Act 1838, which established the Public Record Office in that same year.

The Commissioners' second objective was to make the records more accessible through the compilation of finding aids (indexes and calendars), and where possible the publication of these, as well as the publication of full texts of selected records of particular importance. The sixth Commission employed four sub-Commissioners (Joseph Hunter, Francis Palgrave, Joseph Stevenson, and for a time John Caley), as well as other ad hoc editors and a number of clerks, specifically on the task of editing records for publication. Most of the Commission's publications used a "record type" typeface, designed to present the text in a near-facsimile of the manuscript originals. The publications programme was generally considered a success, and many of the Commission's editions remain in current scholarly use. In other cases, however, the absence of a permanent arrangement to the records rapidly rendered the compilation of finding aids redundant.

Publications
The Commissions' publications included:

 See Patent Rolls.
 See Charter Roll.

 (2 vols)
 (4 vols). See Inquisition post mortem.

 See Book of Fees.
 (11 vols). See The Statutes of the Realm.
 (6 vols)

 (3 vols)
 (2 vols). See Hundred Rolls.
 (2 vols)
 (11 vols)
 (An edition of four 11th and 12th-century regional surveys associated with Domesday Book. See Publication of Domesday Book.)
 (A set of indexes to the edition of Domesday Book edited by Abraham Farley and published by the government in 1783. See Publication of Domesday Book.)

 (Records of inquisitions post mortem, and pleadings and depositions, within the Duchy of Lancaster, in 3 vols)
 (3 vols)
 (2 vols: includes in Vol. 2 a text of Nomina Villarum)

 (An edition of the Close Rolls for the years 1204–1224. A second volume, covering the years 1224–27 and also edited by Hardy, was published by the Public Record Office in 1844.)

 (7 vols)
 (2 vols)
 (An edition of the Patent Rolls from 1201 to 1216.)

 (An edition of the Fine rolls to 1216.)

 (2 vols) (A selective edition of excerpts from the Fine rolls of the reign of Henry III.)
 (An edition of feet of fines for the counties of Bedfordshire, Berkshire, Buckinghamshire, Cambridgeshire and Cornwall to 1214. A second volume, covering the counties of Cumberland, Derbyshire, Devon and Dorset was published by the Public Record Office in 1844.)
 (3 vols)
 (An edition of the Charter Rolls from 1199 to 1216.)

 (An edition of manorial extents in Caernarvon and Anglesey, mainly of 1352–53, with other related records)

See also
 Royal Commission on Historical Manuscripts

References

Bibliography

External links

Record
1800 establishments in Great Britain
Archives in the United Kingdom
The National Archives (United Kingdom)
Book publishing in the United Kingdom
Academic publishing